Zimný štadión Liptovský Mikuláš (Liptovský Mikuláš Winter Sports Stadium) is an arena in Liptovský Mikuláš, Slovakia. It is primarily used for ice hockey, and it is the home arena of MHk 32 Liptovský Mikuláš. It was opened in 1949 and holds 3,680 people.

Indoor ice hockey venues in Slovakia
Buildings and structures in Žilina Region